is a masculine Japanese given name.

Possible writings
Isamu can be written using different kanji characters and can mean:
勇, "courage" or "bravery"
勲, "merit"
敢, "gallantry"
武, "war"
The name can also be written in hiragana or katakana.

People

Isamu Akasaki (赤崎 勇, 1929–2021), Japanese scientist
Isamu Chō (長 勇, 1895–1945), Japanese general
, Japanese racewalker
Isamu Imakake, director of Captain Tsubasa
, Japanese politician
, Japanese actor and film director
Isamu Noguchi (野口 勇, 1904–1988), Japanese-American artist and landscape architect
, Japanese skier
Isamu Shibayama (1930-2018), Peruvian-American civil rights activist
Isamu Sonoyama (園山 勇, 1848–1921), Japanese politician
Isamu Takeshita (1869–1949), Japanese Imperial Navy admiral
Isamu Tanonaka (田の中勇, 1932–2010), Japanese voice actor
Yoshii Isamu (吉井勇, 1886–1960), Japanese poet and playwright
Isamu Yamada or Knock Yokoyama (山田勇, 1932–2007), Japanese comedian and politician
Isamu Sonoda (born 1946), retired judoka who competed in the middleweight (-80 kg) division

Fictional characters
Isamu Nakane, a character in Obasan
Isamu Alva Dyson, a character in Macross anime
Isamu Ozu, a character in tokusatsu show Mahou Sentai Magiranger
Isamu Nitta, a character in Shin Megami Tensei III: Nocturne video game
Take Isamu, the protagonist of the manga Buyuden
Doll Isamu, a character in Super Doll Licca-chan
Isamu Akai, a character from the Pocket Monsters manga
Isamu Kurogane, a character from the Beast King GoLion series
, a character from The Kindaichi Case Files

Japanese masculine given names